Shkolnoye is a rural locality (a selo) in Kizlyarsky Selsoviet, Kizlyarsky District, Republic of Dagestan, Russia. The population was 734 as of 2010. There are 9 streets.

Geography 
It is located 8 km northeast of Kizlyar.

Nationalities 
Avars, Russians, Tsakhurs and Dargins live there.

References 

Rural localities in Kizlyarsky District